Nicholas IV can refer to:

 Patriarch Nicholas IV of Constantinople (1147–1151)
 Pope Nicholas IV (1288–1292)
 Patriarch Nicholas IV of Alexandria (1412–1417)
 Nicholas IV, Duke of Opava (c. 1400 – 1437)